The Sanremo Music Festival 1986 was the 36th annual Sanremo Music Festival, held at the Teatro Ariston in Sanremo, province of Imperia, between 13 and 15 February 1986 and broadcast by Rai 1.

The show was hosted by Loretta Goggi, assisted by the trio Anna Pettinelli, Mauro Micheloni and Sergio Mancinelli, who  at the time were the presenters of the musical show Discoring.

The winner of the Big Artists section was Eros Ramazzotti with the song "Adesso tu", while Enrico Ruggeri won the Critics Award with the song "Rien ne va plus".

Lena Biolcati won the "Newcomers" section with the song "Grande grande amore"

Participants and results

Big Artists

Newcomers

References 

Sanremo Music Festival by year
1986 in Italian music
1986 music festivals